Rajiv Gandhi International Airport  is an international airport that serves Hyderabad, the capital of the Indian state of Telangana. It is named after Rajiv Gandhi, former Prime Minister of India. It is owned and operated by GMR Hyderabad International Airport Limited (GHIAL), a public–private consortium. It has also ranked in AirHelp's list of top 10 airports in the world.

Rajiv Gandhi International Airport is India's first greenfield airport built under a public-private partnership model. The airport has an integrated passenger terminal, a cargo terminal and two runways. There are also aviation training facilities, a fuel farm, a solar power plant and two maintenance, repair, and operations (MRO) facilities. The airport serves as a hub for Alliance Air (India), Blue Dart Aviation, SpiceJet and IndiGo. It is a focus city for Air India.

History

Planning (1991–2004)
The existing commercial airport, Begumpet Airport, was unable to handle rising passenger traffic. The state government led by then chief minister N. Chandrababu Naidu initially considered converting Hakimpet Air Force Station to civilian use; however, the Air Force refused. When the State proposed the construction of a new airport for the Air Force, the Ministry of Defence suggested the State consider sites south of Begumpet Airport. By October 1998, the State had narrowed down to three possible locations for the new airport: Bongloor, Nadergul and Shamshabad. Due to its convenient location near two highways (NH 44 and NH 765) and a railway line, Shamshabad was selected in December 1998.

In November 2000, under the N. Chandrababu Naidu government and the Airports Authority of India (AAI) signed a memorandum of understanding on the greenfield airport project, establishing it as a public–private partnership. The State and AAI together would hold a 26% stake in the project, while the remaining 74% would be allotted to private companies. Through a bidding process the Shamshabad international airport with already land acquired of 5500 acres is in government possession and N. Chandrababu Naidu assigned bid to consortium consisting of Grandhi Mallikarjuna Rao (GMR Group) and Malaysia Airports Holdings Berhad was chosen as the holder of the 74% stake.

In December 2002, Hyderabad International Airport Ltd (HIAL), later renamed GMR Hyderabad International Airport Limited (GHIAL), was created as a special purpose entity, into which the State, AAI and GMR–MAHB placed their stakes.

A concession agreement between GHIAL and the Central Government was signed in December 2004, stipulating that no airport within a  radius of RGIA could be operated. Thus, the closure of Begumpet Airport was required.

Construction and opening (2005–2008)

The project was forwarded when Y. S. Rajasekhara Reddy gained power and construction began by GMR on 16 March 2005 when Sonia Gandhi laid the foundation stone. Two days prior, the Central Government had named the airport after former Prime Minister Rajiv Gandhi, who had undergone pilot training in Hyderabad. The naming resulted in opposition from the Telugu Desam Party (TDP). At Begumpet Airport, the international terminal was named after Rajiv Gandhi while the domestic terminal was named after TDP founder N. T. Rama Rao; TDP wanted to continue this naming convention at the new airport. However, the new airport has only one terminal.

Roughly three years after the foundation stone laying ceremony, the airport was inaugurated on 14 March 2008 amid protests. TDP repeated its demand for the naming of the domestic terminal. In addition, on 12 and 13 March, 20,000 AAI employees had conducted a strike against the closure of Begumpet Airport, as well as that of HAL Airport in Bangalore, fearing they would lose their jobs.

RGIA was originally scheduled to open to commercial operations on 16 March 2008; however, the date was delayed due to protests from some airlines over the high ground handling rates at the airport. Once the rates were reduced, the launch date was set for 23 March 2008. Although Lufthansa Flight 752 from Frankfurt was scheduled to be the first flight to land at RGIA, two SpiceJet flights landed earlier. However, the Lufthansa flight still received the planned ceremonial welcome upon its 12:25 am arrival.

Later developments (2009–present)

In September 2011, SpiceJet launched its regional hub at RGIA, using its new Bombardier Q400 aircraft. The airline, which chose Hyderabad due to its central location in the country, flies to several Tier-II and Tier-III cities from the airport. Regional airline TruJet too opened a hub at RGIA upon commencing operations in July 2015.

In November 2014, the Ministry of Civil Aviation resolved that the domestic terminal of RGIA would be named after N. T. Rama Rao,  resulting in protests from members of the Rajya Sabha. Airport officials remained unsure as to how the naming would occur.

Ownership
RGIA is owned and operated by GMR Hyderabad International Airport Ltd (GHIAL), a public–private venture. It is composed of public entities Airports Authority of India (13%) and the Government of Telangana (13%), as well as a private consortium between GMR Group (63%) and Malaysia Airports Holdings Berhad (11%). Per the concession agreement between GHIAL and the Central Government, GHIAL has the right to operate the airport for 30 years, with the option to continue doing so for another 30 years. In May 2022, Central Government  extended the concession agreement term of GHIAL from March 23, 2038, up to March 22, 2068.

Facilities

Structure
The remaining  is expansion of the airport. No further land will be acquired. The airport is fully planned within .

Runways
The airport has two runways:
 Runway 09L/27R: .
 Runway 09R/27L: , ILS equipped.

Runway 09R/27L, the original and primary runway, is long enough to be able to receive the Airbus A380 which is the world's largest passenger aircraft. Originally a taxiway, runway 09L/27R was inaugurated in February 2012. Its length is shorter than the main runway and able to handle aircraft such as the Airbus A340 and Boeing 747. It is mainly used when runway 09R/27L is undergoing maintenance, and as air traffic to the airport rises it will be used more often. North of these runways are the three parking aprons: the cargo, passenger terminal and MRO aprons. The passenger terminal apron contains parking stands on both the north and south sides of the terminal. Hyderabad was the first city in south India to have a parallel runway at the time of inauguration of the second runway.

Terminal
The western side of the terminal handles international flights while the eastern side is for domestic operations. There are 46 immigration counters and 96 check-in desks with 19 kiosks for self check-in. There is a total of nine gates, seven of which are located on the south side of the terminal and the other two on the north side. Three gates are each equipped with two jetways to accelerate the handling of widebody aircraft. Public lounge facilities are provided by Plaza Premium Lounge, which operates three lounges in the terminal; there are also three separate lounges for VIPs. The pre-security "airport village" is a meeting point for passenger pick-up.

The airport has 57 parking bays: 47 remote parking bays and 10 aero bridges. In January 2019 the GHIAL added another 26 parking bays which makes a total of 83 parking bays.

Airlines and destinations

Passenger

Cargo

Statistics

GMR Aerospace Park
The GMR Aerospace Park contains several facilities primarily related to the aviation sector. It has a  special economic zone, which includes an  Free Trade and Warehousing Zone, as well as a domestic tariff area.

Aviation training
The GMR Aviation Academy is located in the park. It was established in 2009 in co-operation with the International Air Transport Association (IATA), International Civil Aviation Organization (ICAO), Airports Council International (ACI) and the Directorate General of Civil Aviation (DGCA). The academy offers programmes related to airport operations, which are accredited by the listed organisations. The park also includes the Asia Pacific Flight Training (APFT) academy, an initiative of GMR Group and Asia Pacific Flight Training. Launched in 2013, it provides pilot training courses.

GMR Aero Technic Ltd MRO
The MRO operated by GMR Aero Technic Ltd is one of two MROs at the airport. Initially, the MRO was a joint venture between GMR Group and Malaysian Aerospace Engineering (MAE), a subsidiary of Malaysia Airlines. However, amid its parent's poor financial situation following the Malaysia Airlines Flight 370 incident, MAE was unable to fund the MRO, which had been accruing losses. GMR bought out MAE's stake in December 2014.

GMR Aero Technic Ltd is the only one MRO in private sector in India with extensive capability to maintain Airbus A320 family aircraft, Boeing 737, ATR 72/42 and Bombardier DHC Q400 aircraft. GMR Aero Technic is a world class aircraft maintenance organisation approved by EASA and Directorate General of Civil Aviation (India) and various civil aviation authorities and one of the few MROs certified for AS9110 standards in South East Asia region.

Other facilities

Air India MRO
The other MRO is operated by Air India Engineering Services Limited (AIESL), a subsidiary of Air India.

Cargo terminal

The cargo terminal is located west of the passenger terminal. The terminal is operated by Hyderabad Menzies Air Cargo Pvt Ltd, a joint venture between GHIAL (51%) and Menzies Aviation (49%). Within the terminal is the Pharma Zone, a temperature-controlled facility designed for storing pharmaceuticals. The first such facility to be opened at an Indian airport, it is important to RGIA as pharmaceuticals account for 70% of exports from the airport. In May 2011, Lufthansa Cargo launched its first pharma hub at the airport.

Fuel farm
The tanks are connected to the apron via underground pipelines. Reliance Industries built and operates the farm, which can be used by any oil company under an open-access model.

Solar power plant
In January 2016, GHIAL commissioned a 5 MW solar power plant near RGIA, which will be used to serve the airport's energy needs. Over the following two to three years, the capacity of the plant will be raised to 30 MW, allowing RGIA to become fully solar powered.

Airport hotel

The hotel includes 305 rooms, two restaurants and a lounge for aircrew. It was initially owned by GHIAL before being shifted to subsidiary GMR Hotels and Resorts Ltd. Owing to high losses from low occupancy, GMR began seeking buyers of the hotel in August 2015.

Kartainment Go Karting Track
Kartainment is a professional racing and recreational Go- Karting track located in the GMR Rajiv Gandhi Hyderabad International Airport, Shamshabad. It is made up of 900 meter professional track and 600 meter recreational Go-Karting track. The quality of the track and its maintenance is of extremely high standards and Kartaiment is the preferred choice to host many National Karting Championship events.

GMR Aerocity Hyderabad
In April 2021, GMR Group announced the launch of GMR Hyderabad Airport City, which is proposed to be the largest aerotropolis in India spread across  around Rajiv Gandhi International Airport, and is being billed as an "integrated ecosystem covering Office Space, Retail, Leisure, Entertainment, Hospitality, Education, Healthcare, Aerospace & Logistics".

Connectivity

Road
RGIA is connected to the city of Hyderabad by NH 44, NH 765 and the Outer Ring Road. In October 2009, the PV Narasimha Rao Expressway was completed between Mehdipatnam and Aramghar, where it joins NH 44. This long flyover which is 13 km has reduced travel time between the airport and the city to 30–40 minutes and also provides three entry and exit points.

The "Pushpak – Airport Liner" service of the Telangana State Road Transport Corporation provides bus transportation to different parts of the city. It was launched in December 2012 to replace GMR's Aero Express service.

Rail
Under the second phase of the Hyderabad Metro Rail project, a  rail link between Raidurg and RGIA will be constructed. As of late 2015, feasibility studies on the phase are underway. In August 2019, K. T. Rama Rao said that state cabinet has approved the Hyderabad Airport Metro Express Link from Raidurg to the airport. The alignment to Shamshabad RGI Airport from the Raidurg metro station will be  passing over Bio-diversity Junction, through Roda Mistry college lane, Khajaguda Junction. The 31 km-long Hyderabad Airport Metro Express link will cost around  6250 crore. In September 2021, GMR Group, the company operating the Rajiv Gandhi International Airport (RGIA) in Hyderabad said that it will invest  519.52 crore towards metro connectivity at the airport. During foundation laying ceremony on 9 December 2022, GMR Group contributed  , or 10 per cent of the project's cost.

The closest Indian Railways station is Umdanagar, which is 6 km from the airport.

Awards
In December 2022, the airport was ranked among the most puctual airports in the world, in which it ranked the fourth position, globally, by Cirium, an aviation data analytics company. The airport was awarded as the Best Airport in the category of 15 to 25 million passengers per annum in the Asia-Pacific region for 2022, by Airports Council International in March 2023.

Future plans
In 2009, GHIAL decided to postpone the second phase due to lower growth in passenger traffic than anticipated. The phase was revived in late 2015, as the airport is expected to reach its capacity in 2016. The first leg of this phase will bring the capacity to 18 million passengers annually, and the second leg will raise it to 20 million. The passenger terminal will be enlarged with additional security lanes, check-in counters and other facilities, and solar panels will be built on the roof. In October 2017, GHIAL CEO SGK Kishore confirmed that the airport expansion would start by January 2018, and it is expected to be completed by the end of 2019. But due to the ongoing COVID-19 pandemic, which caused lockdowns, restrictions and curfews, it resulted in lack of labour and delays in work. Construction work has resumed as of mid 2021, and now it is expected to be completed by 2023. The airport terminal will be expanded to include 48 aerobridges, a larger arrival area for faster check out and more check-in desks.

In the midst of the expansion to 25 million, the grant for the 50 million PPA expansion was awarded. The master plan of the airport involves construction of new runways and the terminal on the north side of the airport approach road which replicates the existing runways and terminal on the south of approach road. New cross taxiways will be built on east & west of terminals connecting the runways on north and south of the approach road. The approach road tunnel will be built under the new taxiways which allows free flow of traffic  entering airport from ORR/Bangalore Highway junction and Srisailam Highway as well. The final phase of expansion will increase the terminal capacity to 80 million passengers annually.

See also
 List of airports in India
 List of the busiest airports in India
 List of airports in Telangana
 Warangal Airport

References

External links

 

Airports in Telangana
International airports in India
2008 establishments in Andhra Pradesh
Airports established in 2008
Transport in Hyderabad, India
Buildings and structures in Hyderabad, India